An intelligent sensor is a sensor that takes some predefined action when it senses the appropriate input (light, heat, sound, motion, touch, etc.).

Description 
The sensor has to do the following tasks: 
Give a digital signal.
Be able to communicate the signal.
Be able to execute logical functions and instructions.

Elements of intelligent sensors
 Primary sensing element
 Excitation control
 Amplification
 Analogue filtering
 Data conversion
 Compensation
 Digital information processing
 Digital communication processing

Technical capacities
Because the tasks are performed by microprocessors, any gadget which mixes a sensor and a microprocessor is usually called an intelligent sensor.

To qualify as an intelligent sensor, the sensor and processor must be part of the same physical unit.  A sensor whose only function is to detect and send an unprocessed signal to an external system which performs some action is not considered intelligent.

Ubiquitous Sensor Networks (USN) 
Ubiquitous Sensor Networks (USN) is used to describe a network of intelligent sensors that
could, one day, become ubiquitous.

See also 
 Real-time locating system
 Smart transducer
 Internet of things

References 

Sensors